Huguette Oligny,  (January 31, 1922 - May 9, 2013) was a Canadian actress active in theatre, film and television.

Born in Montreal, Quebec, to a French-Canadian father and French mother, she began her theatrical career in 1939. Though mostly known for having played the great classics of French theatre she also performed in modern Quebec plays, notably by Michel Tremblay.  She married Gratien Gélinas, a great pioneer of Quebec theatre, in 1973. Her first marriage to Marcel Alexandre, with whom she had two children, ended in divorce.

In 1984 she was made an Officer of the Order of Canada and was promoted to Companion in 1996. In 1999 she was made an Officer of the National Order of Quebec.

Filmography

References

External links
 
  Fonds Huguette Oligny (R13877) at Library and Archives Canada

1922 births
2013 deaths
Canadian television actresses
Companions of the Order of Canada
Officers of the National Order of Quebec
Actresses from Montreal
Canadian stage actresses
Canadian film actresses